Alfa Romeo 40A is one of the first buses produced by the Italian company Alfa Romeo.

Technical characteristics
The bus uses 4 cylinder engine with 45 horsepower. It has 2 wheelbases and places for 50 passengers (single version) and a double version for 70. The bus has 2 doors and 14 seats.

History
The buses were constructed with partnership of other Italian vehicle companies.  It use a typical body for the buses in that time.  The double version is with a load in the back.

Transport
Used by:
ATAC Rome
ATM Milan

See also
 List of buses

External links
La guerra e la ricostruzione della rete 

40A